February is National Bird-Feeding Month in the United States.  This celebratory month was created to educate the public on the wild bird feeding and watching hobby.  Because of National Bird-Feeding Month, February has become the month most recognized with wild bird feeding promotions and activities.

History
On February 23, 1994, Congressman John Porter (R-IL) proclaimed February as National Bird-Feeding Month when he read a resolution into the Congressional Record.  Below is the formal resolution that he read.
  

In 2013, Westbrook Boys Varsity Basketball began their state playoff run with the theme "Feed The Birds."

Past themes
Each year, a new theme for National Bird-Feeding Month is selected, and promoted by the National Bird-Feeding Society. The theme for 2012 was "If You Feed Them, They Will Come..."

The theme for 2011 was "Most Wanted - America's Top Ten Backyard Birds" and features ten species from the east and west that are among the most popular to attract. In 2010, the theme was “Hatching Out – An Introduction to the Wild Bird Feeding Hobby.”

References

External links 
 National Bird-Feeding Month
 National Bird-Feeding Society

February observances
Month-long observances